Godartiana is a genus of satyrid butterfly found in the Neotropical realm.

Species
Listed alphabetically:
Godartiana byses (Godart, [1824])
Godartiana muscosa (Butler, 1870)

References

Euptychiina
Butterfly genera
Taxa named by Walter Forster (entomologist)